Johor, also spelled as Johore, is a state of Malaysia in the south of the Malay Peninsula. Johor has land borders with the Malaysian states of Pahang to the north and Malacca and Negeri Sembilan to the northwest. Johor shares maritime borders with Singapore to the south and Indonesia to both the west and east. Johor Bahru is the capital city and the economic centre of the state, Kota Iskandar is the seat of the state government, and Muar serves as the royal town of the state. The old state capital is Johor Lama. As of 2020, the state's population is 4.01 million, making it the second most populated state in Malaysia. Johor has highly diverse tropical rainforests and an equatorial climate. The state's mountain ranges form part of the Titiwangsa Range, which is part of the larger Tenasserim Range connected to Thailand and Myanmar, with Mount Ophir being the highest point in Johor. While its state capital, Johor Bahru, which is located within Iskandar Malaysia development corridor, is one of the most densely populated and fastest-growing urban areas in Malaysia.

Johor has high diversity in ethnicity, culture, and language. The state is known for its traditional dance of zapin and Kuda kepang. The head of state is the Sultan of Johor, while the head of government is the Menteri Besar. The government system is closely modelled on the Westminster parliamentary system, with the state administration divided into administrative districts. Islam is the state religion per the 1895 Constitution of Johor, but other religions can be freely practised. Both Malay and English have been accepted as official languages for the state since 1914.

The economy is mainly based on services and manufacturing sectors. Johor is one of the main economic powerhouses in Malaysia and is currently among the top 4 contributors to the national gross domestic product, along with Selangor, Kuala Lumpur and Sarawak. It is also one of the most vital international trade centres in Malaysia, with Port of Tanjung Pelepas being the 15th busiest port in the world, as well as the busiest container port in the nation.

Etymology 

The area was first known to the northern inhabitants of Siam as Gangganu or Ganggayu (Treasury of Gems) due to the abundance of gemstones near the Johor River. As the local people found it difficult to pronounce the Arabic word in the local dialect, the name subsequently became Johor. Meanwhile, the Old Javanese eulogy of Nagarakretagama called the area  ('land's end'), as it is the southernmost point of mainland Asia. Both  and  had been mentioned since before the foundation of the Sultanate of Malacca.

History

Hindu-Buddhist Era 

A bronze bell estimated to be from 150 A.D. was found in Kampong Sungai Penchu near the Muar River. The bell is believed to have been used as a ceremonial object rather than a trade object as a similar ceremonial bell with the same decorations was found in Battambang Province, Cambodia, suggesting that the Malay coast came in contact with Funan, with the bell being a gift from the early kingdom in mainland Asia to local chieftains in the Malay Peninsula. Another important archaeological find was the ancient lost city of Kota Gelanggi, which was discovered by following trails described in an old Malay manuscript once owned by Stamford Raffles. Artefacts gathered in the area have reinforced claims of early human settlement in the state. The claim of Kota Gelanggi as the first settlement is disputed by the state government of Johor, with other evidence from archaeological studies conducted by the state heritage foundation since 1996 suggesting that the historic city is actually located in Kota Tinggi District at either Kota Klang Kiu or Ganggayu. The exact location of the ancient city is still undisclosed, but is said to be within the  forest reserve where the Lenggiu and Madek Rivers are located, based on records in the Malay Annals that, after conquering Gangga Negara, Raja Suran from Siam of the Nakhon Si Thammarat Kingdom (Ligor Kingdom) had sailed to Ganggayu. Since ancient times, most of the coastal Malay Peninsula has had their own rulers, but all fell under the jurisdiction of Siam.

Sultanate of Johor 

After the fall of Malacca in 1511 to the Portuguese, the Johor Sultanate, based on the descendants of the Malaccan Sultanate, was founded by Mahmud's son, Ala'udin Ri'ayat Shah II, in 1528 when he moved the royal court to the Johor River and set up his royal residence in Johor Lama. Johor became an empire spanning the southern Malay Peninsula, Riau Archipelago (including Singapore), Anambas Islands, Tambelan Archipelago, Natuna Islands, a region around the Sambas River in south-western Borneo and Siak in Sumatra together with allies of Pahang, Aru and Champa, and it aspired to retake Malacca from the Portuguese. The Aceh Sultanate in northern Sumatra had the same ambition, which led to a three-way war among the rivals. During the wars, the Johor administrative capital moved several times based on military strategies and to maintain authority over trading in the region. Johor and the Portuguese began to collaborate against Aceh, which they saw as a common enemy. In 1582 the Portuguese helped Johor thwart an attack by Aceh, but the arrangement ended when Johor attacked the Portuguese in 1587. Aceh continued its attacks against the Portuguese, and was later destroyed when a large armada from the Portuguese port in Goa came to defend Malacca and destroy the sultanate.

After Aceh was left weakened, the Dutch East India Company (VOC) arrived and Johor formed an alliance with them to eliminate the Portuguese in the second capture of Malacca in 1641. Johor regained authority over many of its former dependencies in Sumatra, such as Siak (1662) and Indragiri (1669), which had fallen to Aceh while Malacca was taken by the Dutch. Malacca was placed under the direct control of Batavia in Java. Although Malacca fell under Dutch authority, the Dutch did not establish any further trading posts in the Malay Peninsula and Sumatra, as they had less interest than what they had over Java and Maluku Islands. Only when the Bugis began to threaten Dutch maritime trade did they become involved with local disputes.

The dynasty of the Malaccan descendants lasted until the death of Mahmud II, when it was succeeded by the Bendahara Dynasty, a dynasty of ministers who had previously served in the Malacca Sultanate. The Dutch felt increasingly threatened in the 18th century, especially when the English East India Company started to establish a presence in the northern Malay Peninsula, leading the Dutch to seize the Bugis areas of Riau and expel the Bugis from both Riau and Selangor so these areas would not fall under British rule. This ended Bugis political domination in the Johor-Pahang-Riau empire, resulting in the Bugis being banned from Riau in 1784. During the rivalry between the Bugis and Dutch, Mahmud Shah III concluded a treaty of protection with the VOC on board the HNLMS Utrecht and the sultan was allowed to reside in Riau with Dutch protection. Since then, mistrust between the Bugis and Malay escalated. From 1796 to 1801 and from 1807 to 1818, Malacca was placed under British Residency as the Netherlands were conquered by France in the Napoleonic Wars, but it was returned to the Dutch in 1818. Malacca served as the staging area for the British victory in 1811.

British protectorate 

After the death of Mahmud Shah III, the sultan left two sons through commoner mothers. While the elder son Hussein Shah was supported by the Malay community, the younger son Abdul Rahman Muazzam Shah was supported by the Bugis community. In 1818, the Dutch recognised Abdul Rahman Muazzam Shah as the legitimate heir to the Johor Empire in return for his supporting their intention to establish a trading post in Riau. The following year, the British recognised Hussein Shah as the legitimate heir to the Johor Empire in return for his supporting their intention to establish a trading post in Singapore. Before his death, Mahmud Shah III had appointed Abdul Rahman as the Temenggong for Johor with recognition from the British as the legitimate Temenggong of Johor-Singapore, marking the beginning of the Temenggong Dynasty. Abdul Rahman was succeeded by his son, Daeng Ibrahim, although his recognition by the British only occurred 14 years later.

With the partition of the Johor Empire due to the dispute between the Bugis and Malay and following the defined spheres of influence for the British and Dutch resulting from the Anglo-Dutch Treaty of 1824, Daeng Ibrahim intended to create a new administrative centre for the Johor Sultanate under the new dynasty. As he maintained a close relationship with the British and the latter wanted to have full control over trade in Singapore, a treaty was signed between Daeng Ibrahim and Hussein Shah's successor, Ali Iskandar, recognising Ali as the next sultan. Through the treaty, Ali was crowned as the sultan and received $5,000 (in Spanish dollars) and an allowance of $500 per month, but was required to cede the sovereignty of the territory of Johor (except Kesang of Muar, which would be the only territory under his control) to Daeng Ibrahim.

With the establishment of a new capital in mainland Johor, the administrative centre was moved from Telok Blangah in Singapore. As the area was still an undeveloped jungle, the Temenggong encouraged the migration of Chinese and Javanese to clear the land and develop an agricultural economy in Johor. During his reign, Johor began to be modernised and this was continued by his son, Abu Bakar. In 1885, an Anglo-Johor Treaty was signed that formalised the close relations between the two, with the British given transit rights for trade through the sultanate territory and responsibility for its foreign relations, as well as providing protection to the latter. The treaty also provided for the appointment of a British agent in an advisory role, although no advisor was appointed until 1910. Abu Bakar also implemented a constitution known as the Undang-undang Tubuh Negeri Johor (Johor State Constitution) and organised his administration in a British style. By adopting an English-style modernisation policy, Johor temporarily prevented itself from being directly controlled by the British, as happened to other Malay states.

Under the reign of Ibrahim, the British appointed Douglas Graham Campbell as an advisor to the sultanate in 1910, although the sultan only appointed Campbell as a General Adviser unlike in other Malayan states which had Resident Advisors, becoming the last Malay state to accept a British Adviser. However, due to Ibrahim's overspending, the sultanate faced problems caused by the falling price of its major source of revenue and problems between him and members of his state council, which gave the British an opportunity to intervene in Johor's internal affairs. Despite Ibrahim's reluctance to appoint a British adviser, Johor was brought under British control as one of the Unfederated Malay States (UMS) by 1914, with the position of its General Adviser elevated to that of a Resident in the Federated Malay States (FMS).

Second World War 

Since the 1910s, Japanese planters had been involved in numerous estates and in the mining of mineral resources in Johor as a result of the Anglo-Japanese Alliance. After the First World War, rubber cultivation in Malaya was largely controlled by Japanese companies. Following the abolition of the Rubber Lands Restrictions (Enactment) in 1919, Gomu Nanyo Company (South Seas Rubber Co. Ltd.) began cultivating rubber in the interior of Johor. By the 1920s, Ibrahim had become a personal friend of Tokugawa Yoshichika, a scion of the Tokugawa clan whose ancestors were military leaders (shōgun in Japanese) who ruled Japan from the 16th to the 19th centuries. In the Second World War, at a great cost of lives in the Battle of Muar in Johor as part of the Malayan Campaign, Imperial Japanese Army (IJA) forces with their bicycle infantry and tanks advanced into Muar District (present-day Tangkak District) on 14 January 1942. During the Japanese forces' arrival, Tokugawa accompanied General Tomoyuki Yamashita's troops and was warmly received by Ibrahim when they reached Johor Bahru at the end of January 1942. Yamashita and his officers stationed themselves at the Sultan's residence, Istana Bukit Serene, and the state secretariat building, Sultan Ibrahim Building, to plan for the invasion of Singapore. Some of the Japanese officers were worried since the location of the palace left them exposed to the British, but Yamashita was confident that the British would not attack since Ibrahim was also a friend to the British, which proved to be correct.

On 8 February, the Japanese began to bombard the northwestern coastline of Singapore, which was followed by the crossing of the IJA 5th and 18th Divisions with around 13,000 troops through the Straits of Johor. The following day, the Imperial Guard Division crossed into Kranji while the remaining Japanese Guard troops crossed through the repaired Johor–Singapore Causeway. Following the occupation of the whole of Malaya and Singapore by the Japanese, Tokugawa proposed a reform plan by which the five kingdoms of Johor, Terengganu, Kelantan, Kedah-Penang and Perlis would be restored and federated. Under the scheme, Johor would control Perak, Selangor, Negeri Sembilan and Malacca while a  area in the southern part of Johor would be incorporated into Singapore for defence purposes. The five monarchs of the kingdoms would be obliged to pledge loyalty to Japan, would need to visit the Japanese royal family every two years, and would assure the freedom of religion, worship, employment and private ownership of property to all people and accord every Japanese residing in the kingdoms with treatment equal to indigenous people.

Meanwhile, Ōtani Kōzui of the Nishi Hongan-ji sub-sect of Jōdo Shinshū Buddhism suggested that the sultan system should be abolished and Japan should rule the Malay kingdoms under a Japanese constitutional monarchy government. Japanese War Minister Hideki Tōjō, however, had already reminded their government staff in Malaya to refrain from acting superior to the sultan and to pay respect so the sultan would co-operate with the gunsei (Japanese military organisation). In May, many high-ranking Japanese officials returned to Tokyo to consult with officials of the War Ministry and General Staff on how to deal with the Sultan. Upon their return to Singapore in July, they published a document called "A Policy for the Treatment of the Sultan", which was a demand for the Sultan to surrender his power over his people and land to the Japanese emperor through the IJA commander. The military organisation demanded the Sultan surrender his power in a manner reminiscent of the way the Tokugawa shogunate surrendered their power to the Japanese emperor in 1868. Through the Japanese administration, many massacres of civilians occurred with an estimate that 25,000 ethnic Chinese civilians in Johor perished during the occupation. In spite of that, the Japanese established the Endau Settlement (also known as the New Syonan Model Farm) in Endau for Chinese settlers to ease the food supply problem in Singapore.

Post-war and independence 

At the start of the war, the British had accepted the offer of the Communist Party of Malaya (CPM) to co-operate to fight the Japanese; to do this, the CPM formed the Malayan People’s Anti-Japanese Army (MPAJA). The CPM supporters were mostly Chinese-educated members discriminated against by the English-educated elite and the Babas (Straits-born Chinese) during the British rule whose main objective was to establish gain independence from foreign Empires and to establish a socialist state based on Marxist-Leninist ideology, similar to Communist victories in the People's Republic of China. The party also had Malay and Indian representatives. They advocated violence as a method of achieving their outcomes. Throughout their war against the Japanese, they also assassinated civilians suspected of collaborating with the Japanese being killed, while kidnapped Malay women were used as comfort women, as had also been done by the Japanese. This led to retaliatory raids from some Malays affected by the attacks who decided to collaborate with the Japanese. This indirectly led to ethnic conflict, especially when ethnic propaganda was being fanned by both sides, leading to the loss of more innocent lives, especially from those who were not involved on either side. The Allied forces launched Operation Tiderace and Operation Zipper to liberate Malaya and Singapore. In the five weeks before the British resumed control over Malaya following the Japanese surrender on 16 August 1945, the MPAJA emerged as the de facto authority in the Malayan territory.

Johor and the rest of Malaya were officially placed under the British Military Administration (BMA) in September 1945 and the MPAJA was disbanded in December after its secretary-general, Lai Teck (who was also a double agent for the British), accepted the return of British colonial rule and adopted a moderate "open and legal" struggle for their ideological goals with most members receiving medals from the British the following year. Then there was a dispute between the British and CPM since the British had returned and Lai Teck had disappeared with the funds of the CPM. The party administration was taken over by Chin Peng, who abandoned the "moderate strategy" in favour of a "people's revolutionary war", culminating in the Malayan Emergency of 1948. In the emergency period, large-scale attacks by the CPM occurred in the present-day Kulai District and other parts of Malaya, but failed to establish Mao Zedong-style "liberated areas".

Fighting between the British occupation forces and their Malayan collaborators against the People's Army continued through the formation of the Malayan Union on 1 April 1946 and the proclamation of the independence of the Federation of Malaya on 31 August 1957. At the time of independence there were three political factions: the Communists, the pro-British, and a race-based coalition. The pro-British side was divided between the Malayan Democratic Union (MDU), which was dominated by English-speaking Chinese and Eurasians who co-operate with left-wing Malay nationalists "for an independent Malaya that would also include Singapore" and another pro-British side comprising the Babas under the Straits Chinese British Association (SCBA), who were trying to retain their status and privileges granted for their loyalty to the British during the Straits Settlements era by remaining under British administration. Meanwhile, the racial coalition, comprising the leading United Malays National Organisation (UMNO) in an alliance with the Malaysian Indian Congress (MIC) and Malaysian Chinese Association (MCA), sought an independent Malaya based on a racial and religious privileges policy and won the 1955 Malayan general election, with the capital of Johor Bahru being the centre of the UMNO party.

Malaysia 

In 1961, the Prime Minister of the Federation of Malaya Tunku Abdul Rahman desired to unite Malaya with the British colonies of North Borneo, Sarawak and Singapore. Despite growing opposition from the governments in both Indonesia and the Philippines as well from Communist sympathisers and nationalists in Borneo, the federation was realised on 16 September 1963, with the sovereign state renamed Malaysia. The Indonesian government later launched a "policy of confrontation" towards the new federation, which prompted the British and their allies of Australia and New Zealand to deploy armed forces. Pontian District became the coastal landing point for amphibious Indonesian troops during the confrontation while Labis and Tenang in Segamat District became the landing point for parachuted Indonesian para-commandos for subversion and sabotage attacks. Several encounters occurred in Kota Tinggi District, where nine Malayan/Singaporean troops and half of the Indonesian infiltrators were killed and the other Indonesians were captured. Despite several attacks that also cost civilian lives, the Indonesian side did not reach their main objective, and the confrontation ended in 1966 following the internal political struggle in Indonesia resulting from the 30 September Movement.

Since the end of the confrontation, the state's development has expanded further with industrial estates and new suburbs. Of the total approved development projects for Johor from 1980 until 1990, 69% were concentrated in Johor Bahru and the Pasir Gudang area. Industrial estates and new suburbs were built in settlements on both the northern and eastern sides of the town, including Plentong and Tebrau. The town of Johor Bahru was officially recognised as a city on 1 January 1994. On 22 November 2017, Iskandar Puteri was declared a city and assigned as the administrative center of the state, located in Kota Iskandar.

Politics

Government 

Johor is a constitutional monarchy and was the first state in Malaysia to adopt the system via Undang-undang Tubuh Negeri Johor (the Johor State Constitution) written by Sultan Abu Bakar in 1895. The constitutional head of Johor is the Sultan. This hereditary position can only be held by a member of the Johor Royal Family who is descended from Abu Bakar. The current Sultan of Johor is Ibrahim Ismail, who took over the throne on 23 January 2010. The main royal palace for the Sultan is the Bukit Serene Palace, while the royal palace for the Crown Prince is the Istana Pasir Pelangi; both palaces are located in the state capital. Other palaces are the Grand Palace (which is also located in the state capital), Tanjong Palace in Muar, Sri Lambak in Kluang and Shooting Box in Segamat.

The state government is headed by a Menteri Besar, who is assisted by an 11-member executive council (exco) selected from the state assembly members. The legislative branch of Johor's government is the Johor State Legislative Assembly, which is based on the Westminster system. Therefore, the chief minister is appointed based on his or her ability to command the majority of the state assembly. The state assembly makes laws in matters regarding the state. Members of the Assembly are elected by citizens every five years by universal suffrage. There are 56 seats in the assembly. The majority (40 seats) are currently held by Barisan Nasional (BN).

Johor was a sovereign state from 1948 until 1957 while the Federation of Malaya Agreement was in force, but its defence and external affairs were mainly under the control of Britain. The Malayan Federation was then merged with two British colonies in Borneo, North Borneo, and Sarawak, to form the Federation of Malaysia. Since then, several disputes have arisen such as the incident involving the state royal family that resulted in the 1993 amendments to the Constitution of Malaysia, disputes with federal leaders on state and federation affairs, and dissatisfaction over slower development in contrast with the long-standing prosperity in neighbouring Singapore, which even led to statements about secession from the Johor Royal Family. Other social issues include the rise of racial and religious intolerance among the state's citizens since being part of the federation.

Administrative divisions 

Johor is divided into ten districts (daerah), 103 mukims and 16 local governments. There are district officers for each district and a village head person (known as a ketua kampung or penghulu) for each village in the district. Before the British arrival, Johor was run by a group of relatives and friends of the Sultan. A more organised administration was developed in the treaty of friendship with Great Britain in 1885. A British Resident began to be accepted in 1914 when the state became part of the UMS. With the transformation into a British-style administration, more Europeans were appointed into the administration with their role expanding from advising on financial matters to modern administration guidance. Malay state commissioners worked alongside British district officers, known in Johor as "Assistant Advisers". When the post of the Resident of the UMS was abolished, other European-held posts in the administration were replaced with locals. As in the rest of Malaysia, the local government comes under the purview of the state government.

Security 

The Ninth Schedule of the Constitution of Malaysia states that the Malaysian federal government is solely responsible for foreign policy and military forces in the country. However, Johor has a private army, the only state to do so. The retention of the army was one of the stipulations in 1946 that Johor made when it participated in the Federation of Malaya. This army, the Royal Johor Military Force (Askar Timbalan Setia Negeri Johor), has since 1886 served as the protector of the Johor monarchs. It is one of the oldest military units in present-day Malaysia and had a significant historical role in the suppression of the 1915 Singapore Mutiny and served in both World Wars.

Territorial disputes 

Johor previously had a territorial dispute with Singapore. Following the publication of the Malaysian Territorial Waters and Continental Shelf Boundaries Map by the government of Malaysia in 1979 that included the island of Batu Puteh (present-day Pedra Branca) as part of their sovereignty, Singapore lodged a formal protest the following year. The dispute originally concerned only the one feature, but when both sides agreed to refer the matter to the International Court of Justice (ICJ) in 2003, the dispute was enlarged to include two other features in the vicinity, Middle Rocks (MR) and South Ledge (SL). In 2008 the ICJ decided that "Batu Puteh belongs to Singapore, Middle Rocks to Malaysia and South Ledge belongs to the state in the territorial waters of which it is located". The final decision by ICJ to award Pedra Branca to Singapore is in line with the 1953 letter made by the Acting State Secretary of Johor in response to the question letter regarding Pedra Branca from the Colonial Secretary of Singapore, where the Johor government openly stated that it does not claim ownership of Pedra Branca despite acknowledging that the old Johor Empire once ruled most of the islands in the area. In 2017, Malaysia appealed the case of Pedra Branca based on the conditions required by the ICJ that a case could be revised within six months of discovery of facts and within ten years of the date of judgement following the discovery of several facts. The request was dropped following internal changes in the new Malaysian administration the following year where they subsequently acknowledged Singapore's permanent sovereignty over the island while announcing plans to convert the Middle Rocks, which are under Malaysia's sovereignty, into an island.

Geography 

A majority of its coastline, especially on the west coast, covered with mangrove and nipah forests. The east coast is dominated by sand beaches and rocky headlands, while the south coast consists of a series of alternating headlands and bays. Its exclusive economic zone (EEZ) extends much further in the South China Sea than in the Straits of Malacca. The western part of Johor had a considerable number of peatlands. In 2005, the state recorded  of forested land, which is classified into natural inland forest, peat swamp forest, mangrove forest and mud flat. The foothills of the Titiwangsa Range extend towards Johor, with the highest point being Mount Ophir, with a height of 1,276 metres. There are another ten mountains in the state with heights from 273 metres to 1,010 metres. About 83% of Johor's terrain is lowlands areas, while only 17% is higher and steep terrain.

Much of central Johor is covered with dense forest, where an extensive network of rivers originating from mountains and hills in the area spreads to the west, east and south. On the west coast, the Batu Pahat River, Muar River and Pontian River flow to the Straits of Malacca, while the Johor River, Malay River, Perepat River, Pulai River, Skudai River and Tebrau River flow to the Straits of Johor in the south. The Endau River, Mersing River, Sedili Besar River and Sedili Kecil River flow to the South China Sea in the east. The Johor River Basin covers an area of 2,690 kilometres, starting from Mount Belumut (east of Kluang) and Mount Gemuruh (to the north) downstream to Tanjung Belungkor. The river itself originates from the Layang-Layang, Linggiu, and Sayong rivers before converging into the main river and flowing southeast to the Straits of Johor for 122.7 kilometres. Its tributaries include the Berangan River, Lebak River, Lebam River, Panti River, Pengeli River, Permandi River, Seluyut River, Semangar River, Telor River, Tembioh River, and Tiram River. Other river basins in Johor including the Ayer Baloi River, Benut River, Botak Drainage, Jemaluang River, Pontian Besar River, Sanglang River, Santi River, and Sarang Buaya River.

Johor is located in a tropical region with an equatorial climate. Both the temperature and humidity are consistently high throughout the year with heavy rainfall. The west coast receives an average of 2,000 millimetres to 2,500 millimetres of rain, while in the east the average rainfall is higher, with Endau and Pengerang receiving more than 3,400 millimetres of rain a year. The state experiences two monsoon seasons, the northeast and southwest seasons; the northeast occurs from November until March while the southeast occurs from May until September, and the transitional months for the monsoon seasons are April and November. The state experienced extreme flooding from December 2006 to January 2007 with around 60,000–70,000 of the state residents evacuated to an emergency shelter. Since the state also lies on the Sunda Plate, it experiences tremors from nearby earthquakes in Sumatra, Indonesia.

Biodiversity 

The jungles of Johor host a diverse array of plant and animal species, with an estimated 950 vertebrates species, comprising 200 mammals, 600 birds and 150 reptiles, along with 2,080 invertebrate species. Destinations in Peta including the Buaya Sangkut Waterfalls, Upeh Guling Waterfalls, Air Biru Lake, Janing Barat, Nature Education and Research Centre (NERC), Kuala Jasin and Peta indigenous village, while in Selai the area is mostly for hiking and jungle trekking. Some iconic mammal species inside the national park include the Asian elephant, clouded leopard, Malayan sun bear, Malayan tapir and Malayan tiger.

It has various rivers and streams, waterfalls, diverse rainforest, pines, and sub-montane forest, and Tangkak Dam can also be seen from the park area. Several trails for hiking are available, such as the Asahan Trail, Ayer Panas Trail, Jementah Trail and Lagenda Trail. In 2003, three wetlands in southern Johor comprising Kukup Island, Pulai River and Tanjung Piai were designated as a Ramsar site. The Pulai River became a seahorse sanctuary and hatchery as part of the state biodiversity masterplan, since Johor's waters are home to three of the eight seahorse species in Malaysia.

Poaching is a concern, with the number of wild animals in state parks decreasing with the rise of hunting and fishing in the 2000s. In 2004, local authorities uncovered large-scale sandalwood (gaharu) poaching by foreigners in the Endau-Rompin National Park with a large confiscation of protected plant species from the suspects. The conversion of mangrove areas along the southern and eastern coasts into aquaculture projects, sand mining and rapid urbanisation in addition to the abnormal weather patterns caused by climate change and rising sea levels are contributing to the erosion of the state coastline. In 2017, around 28 rivers in the state were categorised as polluted, leading the authorities and government to push for legislative change and sterner action against river polluters, especially since severe pollution has disrupted the water supply to an estimated 1.8 million people in the state. The worst river pollution involving dangerous chemicals happened in 2019 when nearly 6,000 residents in the industrial area of Pasir Gudang were affected with 2,775 hospitalised. Forest fires have also become a concern with more than 380 recorded throughout the state in 2016.

Economy 

Johor's economy is mainly based on the tertiary sector, namely services, manufacturing, agriculture, construction etc. Johor Corporation (JCorp) is a state-owned conglomerate involved in various business activities in the state and overseas. In 2017, the gross domestic product (GDP) of Johor was RM104.4 billion, the third highest among Malaysian states after Selangor and Sarawak, while the median income was RM5,652 and the unemployment rate was 3.6%. A year before, the economic growth rate of the state was 5.7% and it accounted for 9.4% of Malaysia's GDP, with GDP per capita at RM31,952. The state has a total workforce of 1.639 million people.

Prior to economic diversification, the secondary sector dominated the Johorean economy. Johor continues to have a high level of manufacturing investment. From 2013 to 2017, there was a total of RM114.9 billion worth of investment in manufacturing in the state. In 2017, RM16.8 billion came from domestic direct investment and RM5.1 billion came from foreign direct investment, with Australia, China and the United States being the top three foreign investors in manufacturing. In 2000, the largest industries in Johor were metal fabrication and machinery industries, accounting for 27.6% of all manufacturing industries in the state, followed by chemical products, petroleum and rubber industries (20.1%) and wooden products and furniture (14.1%).

Southern Johor focuses on trading and services; western Johor focuses on manufacturing, business and modern farming; eastern Johor focuses on ecotourism; and central Johor focuses on both ecotourism and the primary sector economy.

The main agricultural sectors in the state are palm oil plantation, rubber plantations and produce. In 2015, land area used for agriculture in Johor covered  , 60.15% of the state, with other plantations including herbs and spices. In 2016, palm oil plantations covered  (38.8% of the total land area), making it the third largest plantation area in Malaysia after Sabah and Sarawak. Farmers' markets are used to distribute the agricultural produces which are located around the state.

Due to its close proximity to Singapore, known for its financial hubs and international trade centres, the state benefits from Singaporean investors and tourists. From 1990 to 1992, approved Singapore investments in Johor amounted to about US$500 million in 272 projects. In 1994, the investment from Singapore was nearly 40% of the state's total foreign investment. The state also had a policy of "twinning with Singapore" to promote their industrial development, which increased the movement of people and goods between the two sides. The close economic links between the two began with the establishment of the Indonesia–Malaysia–Singapore Growth Triangle (SIJORI Growth Triangle) in 1989.

In 2014, major foreign countries investing in Johor were Singapore (RM6.7 billion), the United States (RM5.4 billion), Japan (RM4.6 billion), the Netherlands (RM3.1 billion), China (RM1.37 billion) and smaller amounts from countries such as Indonesia, South Korea, Germany and India, with the state received RM7.9 billion worth of foreign direct investment (FDI), the second highest among all states in Malaysia after Sarawak. Major foreign companies with FDI in the state come from the United Kingdom, South Korea and China. The medical tourism industry has grown with the arrival of 27,500 medical tourists in 2012 and 33,700 in 2014.

Infrastructure 

The Johor Department of Economy Planning is responsible for all public infrastructure planning and development in the state, while the Landscape Department is responsible for the state landscape development. Since the Ninth Malaysia Plan (9MP), the Johor Southern Corridor has been a focus for development. Since 2012, around RM2.63 billion has been allocated by the federal and state governments for 33 infrastructure projects in Pengerang in southeastern Johor. The 2015 state budget included spending more than RM500 million for development in the following year, the highest amount ever allocated. The state government also ensured that infrastructure and development projects would be fairly distributed to all districts in the state, with six focus areas outlined in the state government's strategic development plan in 2018. In the same year, the federal government allocated RM250 million for three infrastructure projects to improve connectivity and accessibility within the state capital. Following the recent change in the state government administration, the new government also pledged to provide better infrastructure for investors by improving the road network, providing an adequate water supply for factories and building sub-stations for electricity generation while rejecting foreign companies who masquerade behind green technology to use the state as a solid waste disposal site.

Energy and water resources 

Electricity distribution in the state is managed by Tenaga Nasional Bhd. (TNB). Most electricity is generated by coal and gas-fired plants. The coal power plant had a capacity of 700 MW in 2007 and 3,100 MW in 2016, which originated from the Tanjung Bin Power Station in Pontian. Two gas-fired plants, Pasir Gudang Power Station with 210 MW and Sultan Iskandar Power Station with 269 MW, are located in Pasir Gudang. The Pasir Gudang Power Station, however, was retired from the system in 2016. In recent years, the state government has been planning to construct hydropower and combined cycle power plants.

All water supply pipes in the state are managed by the Water Regulatory Bodies of Johor, with a total of 11 reservoirs: Congok, Gunung Ledang, Gunung Pulai 1, Gunung Pulai 2, Gunung Pulai 3, Juaseh, Layang Lower, Layang Upper, Lebam, Linggiu and Pontian Kechil. The state also supplies raw water to Singapore for RM0.03 for every  drawn from Johor rivers. In return, the Johor state government pays the Singaporean government 50 cents (RM0.50) for every 3.8 cubic metres of treated water from Singapore.

Telecommunication and broadcasting 

Telecommunications in Johor were originally administered by the Posts and Telecommunication Department and maintained by the British Cable & Wireless Communications, which was responsible for all telecommunication services in Malaya. During this time, troposcatter was installed on Mount Pulai in Johor and Mount Serapi in Sarawak to connect radio signals between British Malaya and British Borneo, the only such system for both territories to allow simultaneous transmission of radio programs to North Borneo and Sarawak. Following the foundation of the Federation of Malaysia in 1963, the telecommunication departments in Malaya and Borneo merged to form the Telecommunications Department Malaysia in 1968, which later became Telekom Malaysia (TM). Early in 1964, a Nordic telecommunication company, Ericsson, began operating in the country. Following the first AXE telephone exchange in Southeast Asia that went online in Pelangi in 1980, TM was provided with the first mobile telephone network, named ATUR, in 1984. Since then, the Malaysian cellular network has expanded rapidly. From 2013 until 2017, the state mobile-cellular penetration rate has reached 100%, with 11.3% to 11.5% of the population using the internet.

In 2018, the state internet speed was 10 Mbps with the government urging the Malaysian Communications and Multimedia Commission (MCMC) to develop high-speed Internet infrastructure to reach 100 Mbit/s to match the state's current rapid development. The Malaysian federal government operates one radio channel - Johor FM through its Department of Broadcasting, officially known as Radio Televisyen Malaysia (RTM). There is one independent radio station, Best FM, which launched in 1988. Television broadcasting in the state is divided into terrestrial and satellite television. There are two types of free-to-air television providers, MYTV Broadcasting (digital terrestrial) and Astro NJOI (satellite), while IPTV is accessed via Unifi TV through the UniFi fibre optic internet subscription.

Transportation

Roads

The state is linked to the other Malaysian states and federal territories on the western coast through the North–South Expressway and on the eastern coast through Malaysia Federal Route 3. Since British colonial times, there has been a road system linking Johor's capital in the southern Malay Peninsula to Kangar in the north and Kota Bharu on the east coast. The roads in Johor are classified into two categories;  are federal roads while  are state roads, as of 2016. Johor uses a dual carriageway with the left-hand traffic rule, and towns in the state provide public transportation services such as buses and taxis along with Grab services. The state features Sungai Johor Bridge, the longest central span river-crossing bridge in the country, connecting Johor Bahru and Kota Tinggi District. In 2018, construction of the Iskandar Malaysia Bus Rapid Transit (IMBRT) was announced to be completed before 2021.

The previous federal government had allocated RM29.43 billion as part of the Eleventh Malaysia Plan (11MP) for infrastructure projects including upgrading roads and bridges. The state government also spends more than RM600 million for road maintenance annually.

Rail

Rail transport in the state is operated by Keretapi Tanah Melayu, which consists of Batu Anam, Bekok, Chamek, Genuang, Johor Bahru Sentral Kempas Baru, Kluang, Kulai, Labis, Layang-Layang, Mengkibol, Paloh, Rengam, Senai and Tenang railway stations. The railway line is connected to all of the states in western Peninsular Malaysia. It is also connected to stations in Singapore and Thailand.

Air

The Senai International Airport is the largest and the only international airport in Johor, which acts as the main gateway to the state. The airport is located in Senai Town, Kulai District. In 2016, the Malaysian federal government approved a total of RM7 million in upgrades for the airport. Four airlines fly to Johor: AirAsia, Malaysia Airlines, Firefly and Malindo Air. Other minor airports including Kluang Airport, Mersing Airport, Segamat Airstrip and Batu Pahat Airstrip in Kluang District, Mersing District, Segamat District and Batu Pahat District, respectively.

Water

Johor has four ports in Iskandar Puteri and Pasir Gudang, which operate under three different companies. The Port of Tanjung Pelepas is part of the Malaysian federal container port, while another two container ports, Integrated Container Terminal (also in Tanjung Pelepas) and Johor Port (in Pasir Gudang). The Tanjung Langsat Terminal serves as the state regional oil and gas hub and supports offshore petroleum exploration and production. There are boat services to ports in Batam and Tanjung Pinang of the Bintan Islands in Indonesia and to port in Changi in Singapore.

Healthcare 

Health-related matters in Johor is administered by the Johor State Health Office. The state has two major government hospitals (Sultanah Aminah Hospital and Sultan Ismail Hospital), nine government district hospitals (Permai Hospital, Sultanah Fatimah Hospital, Sultanah Nora Ismail Hospital, Enche' Besar Hajjah Khalsom Hospital, Segamat Hospital, Pontian Hospital, Kota Tinggi Hospital, Mersing Hospital, and Tangkak Hospital), and Temenggung Seri Maharaja Tun Ibrahim Hospital, a women's and children's hospital and mental hospital. Other public health clinics, 1Malaysia clinics and rural clinics are scattered throughout the state with a number of private hospitals such as Penawar Hospital, Johor Specialist Hospital, Regency Specialist Hospital, Pantai Hospital Batu Pahat, Putra Specialist Hospital Batu Pahat, Puteri Specialist Hospital, KPJ Specialist Hospital Muar, Abdul Samad Specialist Hospital, Columbia Asia, Gleneagles Medini Hospital and KPJ Specialist Hospital Pasir Gudang. In 2009, the state's doctor–patient ratio was 3 per 1,000 population.

Education 

All primary and secondary schools are under the jurisdiction of the Johor State Education Department, under the guidance of the national Ministry of Education. The oldest school in Johor is the English College Johore Bahru (1914). As of 2013, Johor had a total of 240 government secondary schools, fifteen international schools (Austin Heights Private and International Schools, Crescendo-HELP International School, Crescendo International College, Excelsior International School, Paragon Private and International School, Seri Omega Private and International School, Sri Ara International Schools, StarClub Education, Sunway International School, Tenby Schools Setia Eco Gardens, UniWorld International School, and the American School of Iskandar Puteri and three international campuses of British Marlborough College, R.E.A.L Schools and Utama Schools), and nine Chinese independent schools. Johor has a considerable number of Malay and indigenous students enrolled in Chinese schools. There is also an Indonesian school located in the state capital mainly for Indonesian migrants' children. Two Japanese learning centres located in the state capital city. The state government also emphasises pre-school education in the state with the establishment of several kindergartens such as Nuri Kindergarten and Childcare, Stellar Preschool and Tadika Kastil.

Johor has three public universities, the University of Technology Malaysia (UTM) in Skudai, Tun Hussein Onn University of Malaysia (UTHM) in Parit Raja, and Universiti Teknologi MARA Johor (UiTM) in Jementah and the state capital; several polytechnics including Ibrahim Sultan Polytechnic and Mersing Polytechnic; and two teaching colleges, IPG Kampus Temenggong Ibrahim in Johor Bahru and IPG Kampus Tun Hussien Onn in Batu Pahat. It has one non-profit community college, Southern University College in Skudai. There is also a proposal to establish the University of Johor that has been welcomed by the state Sultan with the federal education ministry also willing to extend their co-operation. EduHub Pagoh, the largest public higher education hub area in Malaysia, is being constructed at Bandar Universiti Pagoh, a new well-planned education township in Muar.

To ensure the quality of education in the state, the state government introduced six long-term measures to upgrade the capability of local teachers. In 2018, it was reported that Johor was among several Malaysian states facing a teacher shortage, so the federal education ministry set up a special committee to study ways to tackle the problem.

Johor State Library is the main public library in the state.

Demography

Ethnicity and immigration 

The 2020 Malaysian Census reported the population of Johor at 4,009,670, the second most populous state in Malaysia, with a non-citizen population of 276,900. Of the Malaysian residents, 2,409,811 (60.1%) are Bumiputera, 1,315,171 (32.8%) are Chinese, 230,700 (6.0%) are Indian. In 2010, the population was estimated to be around 3,348,243, with 1,972,115 (58.9%) Bumiputera, 1,292,421(38.6%) Chinese, 237,725 (7.1%) Indian. Despite the racial diversity of the population, most people in Johor identify themselves as "Bangsa Johor" (English: Johor race), which is also echoed by the state royal family to unite the population regardless of ancestry.

As Malaysia is one of the least densely populated countries in Asia, the state is particularly sparsely populated, with most people concentrated in the coastal areas, since towns and urban centres have massively expanded through recent developments. From 1991 to 2000, the state experienced a 2.39% average annual population growth, with Johor Bahru District being the highest at 4.59% growth and Segamat District being the lowest at 0.07%. The total population increased by about 600,000 every decade following the increase of residential developments in the southern developmental region; if the pattern continues, Johor will have an estimated 5.6 million people in 2030, larger than the government projection of 4 million. Johor's geographical position in the southern Malay Peninsula has contributed to the state's rapid development as Malaysia's transportation and industrial hub, creating jobs and attracting migrants from other states and overseas, especially from Indonesia, the Philippines, Vietnam, Myanmar, Bangladesh, India, Pakistan and China. As of 2010, nearly two thirds of foreign workers in Malaysia were located in Johor, Sabah and Selangor.

Religion 

Islam became the state religion upon the adoption of the 1895 Johor Constitution, although other religions can be freely practised. The religious affiliation of Johor's population according to the 2010 Malaysian Census was 60.1% Muslim, 32.8% Buddhist, 6.6% Hindu, 3.0% Christian, 1.2% followers of other religions or unknown affiliations, 0.8% Taoist or Chinese folk religion adherents, and 0.3% non-religious. The census indicated that 89.8% of the Chinese population in Johor identified as Buddhists, with significant minorities identifying as Christians (6.8%), Chinese folk religion adherents (2.1%) and Muslims (0.4%). The majority of the Indian population identified as Hindus (87.9%), with significant minorities identifying as Christians (4.05%), Muslims (3.83%) and Buddhists (3.05%). The non-Malay bumiputera community was predominantly Christians (42.3%), with significant minorities identifying as Muslims (25.3%) and Buddhists (13.7%). Among the majority population, all Malay bumiputera identified as Muslims.

Languages 

The majority of Johoreans are at least bilingual with proficiency in Malay and English; both of the languages have been officially recognised in the state constitution since 1914. Other multilingual speakers may also be fluent in Chinese and Tamil languages.

Johorean Malay, also known as Johor-Riau Malay and originally spoken in Johor, Riau, Riau Islands, Malacca, Selangor and Singapore, has been adopted as the basis for both the Malaysian and Indonesian national languages. Due to Johor's location at the confluence of trade routes within Maritime Southeast Asia as well as its history as an influential empire, the dialect has spread as the region's lingua franca since the 15th century; hence the adoption of the dialect as the basis for the national languages of Brunei, Indonesia, Malaysia and Singapore. Several related languages are also spoken in the state such as Orang Seletar (spoken along the Straits of Johor and in northern Singapore), Orang Kanaq (spoken in small parts of southeastern Johor), Jakun (spoken mostly in inland parts of Johor), Temuan (spoken near the border with Pahang and Negeri Sembilan) and Orang Kuala (spoken along the northwest coast of Johor). Terengganu Malay, a distinct variant of Malay, is spoken in the district of Mersing near the border with Rompin, Pahang.

Different dialect groups of the Chinese language are spoken among the Chinese community in the state, including Hokkien, Teochew, Hakka, Cantonese, and Hainanese.

The Indian community predominantly speaks Tamil. Besides, there is a significant number of Malayalee population in parts of Segamat, Johor Bahru and Masai, who speak Malayalam as their mother tongue. Moreover,  small number of other Indian language speakers such as the Telugu, and Punjabi language speakers too exist. Many Malayalees and Telugus are often categorised as Tamils by the Tamils themselves, and by other major races, as they use the Tamil language as a lingua franca among other Indian communities.

In 2017, the Johor queen, as the royal patron of the Malaysian English Language Teaching Association (MELTA), called for a more conducive environment for young Malaysians to master English since there has been a drastic decline in proficiency among the younger Malaysian generation.

Culture 

Johor's culture has been influenced by different ethnicities throughout history, especially by the Arabs, Bugis and Javanese people, with the state also becoming a mixture of different cultures among the Chinese, Indian, Malay and aboriginal people.

A strong Arab cultural influence is apparent in art performances like zapin, masri and hamdolok and in musical instruments like the gambus. The zapin dance was introduced in the 14th century by Arab Muslim missionaries from Hadhramaut, Yemen, and was originally performed only by male dancers, although female dancers are now common. The dance itself differs among five Johor regions, namely zapin tenglu and zapin pulau (Mersing), zapin lenga (Muar), zapin pekajang (Johor Bahru), zapin koris (Batu Pahat) and zapin parit mustar with zapin seri bunian (Pontian). Another Arab legacy is the use of Arabic names with wadi (valley) for areas populated by the Arab community in the state capital such as "wadi hana" and "wadi hassan".

Buginese and Javanese cultural influences are found in the bosara and kuda kepang dances introduced to Johor before the early 20th century by Buginese and Javanese immigrants. Indian culture inspired the ghazal. These cultural activities are normally performed at Malay weddings and religious festivals. The aboriginal culture is also unique with a diversity of traditions still practised, such as the making of traditional weapons, medicines, handicrafts and souvenirs.

The Chinese community holds the Chingay parade annually by the Johor Bahru Old Chinese Temple, which unites the five Chinese ethnic groups in Johor, namely Cantonese, Hainanese, Hakka, Hoklo and Teochew. This co-operation among different Chinese cultures under a voluntary organisation became a symbol of harmony among the different Chinese people that deepens their sense of heritage to preserve their cultural traditions. The Johor Bahru Chinese Heritage Museum describes the history of Chinese migration into Johor from the 14th to 19th centuries during the Ming and Qing dynasties. The ruler of Johor encouraged the Chinese community to plant gambier and pepper in the interior; many of these farmers switched to pineapple cultivation in the 20th century, making Johor one of Malaysia's top fruit producers.

Cuisine 

Cuisine in Johor has been influenced by Arab, Buginese, Javanese, Malay, Chinese and Indian cultures. Notable dishes include asam pedas, Nasi Beringin, cathay laksa, cheese murtabak, Johor laksa, kway teow kia, mee bandung, mee rebus, Muar satay, pineapple pajeri, Pontian wonton noodle, san lou fried bee hoon, otak-otak, telur pindang, and other mixed Malay dishes. Popular desserts include burasak, kacang pool, lontong and snacks like banana cake, Kluang toasted buns and pisang goreng. International restaurants for Western food, Filipino food, Indonesian food, Japanese food, Korean food, Taiwanese food, Thai food and Vietnamese food are found throughout the state, especially in Johor Bahru and Iskandar Puteri.

Holidays and festivals 
Johoreans observe a number of holidays and festivals throughout the year including Independence Day, Malaysia Day celebrations and the Sultan of Johor's Birthday. Additional local and international festivals held annually in the state capital include the Japanese bon odori, kuda kepang and kite and art festivals.

Sports 

As Johor has been part of Malaya since 1957, its athletes represented Malaya and later Malaysia at the Summer Olympic Games, Commonwealth Games, Asian Games, and Southeast Asian Games. The Johor State Youth and Sports Department was established in 1957 to raise the standard of sports in the state. Johor hosted the Sukma Games in 1992. There are four sports complexes in the state, and the federal government also provides aid to improve sports facilities. In 2018, as part of a federal government plan to turn Muar into Johor's sports hub, around RM15 million has been allocated to build and upgrade sports facilities in the town.

Located in Iskandar Puteri, the Sultan Ibrahim Stadium is the main stadium of the football team Johor Darul Ta'zim. The team was founded in 1972 as PKENJ FC and became Johor Darul Ta'zim in 2013. It won the Malaysia FA Cup in 1998, 2016 and 2022, the Malaysia Cup in 1985, 1991, 2017, 2019 and 2022, the Malaysia Super League for nine consecutive seasons between 2014 and 2022, and the AFC Cup in 2015. The state women's football team also won four titles in the Tun Sharifah Rodziah Cup in 1984, 1986, 1987 and 1989. Another notable stadium in the state is Pasir Gudang Corporation Stadium in Pasir Gudang. Johor also has established its own e-sports league and sets to become the second Malaysian state to introduce the sports in Sukma Games after Perak where the Johor Sports Council agreed to include the sports in the 2020 Sukma Games hosted by the state.

References

Further reading

External links 

 
 Johor at Johor Tourism
 Johor at Lonely Planet

English-speaking countries and territories
Feudalism in Malaysia
Former British colonies and protectorates in Asia
 
Malay-speaking countries and territories
Peninsular Malaysia
States of Malaysia
Strait of Malacca